The West Virginia Badgers were a professional indoor football team based in Charles Town, West Virginia. The Badgers were a member of American Indoor Football (AIF). The Badgers began play in 2012 as an expansion member of the AIF. In 2012, they were based in Fredericksburg, Virginia, and were known as the Virginia Badgers. The Badgers played all their games on the road for their two seasons in the AIF.

Season-by-season

|-
|2012 || -- || -- || -- || -- || --
|-

References

External links
 Virginia Badgers official website
 American Indoor Football official website

American football teams in Virginia
American football teams in West Virginia
Former American Indoor Football teams
Sports in Northern Virginia
Fredericksburg, Virginia
American football teams established in 2012
American football teams disestablished in 2013
2012 establishments in Virginia
2013 disestablishments in West Virginia